Shuwayrin, alternatively spelled Shweirin or Shurin, is a village in northern Aleppo Governorate, northwestern Syria. Nearby localities include Rael  to the northwest and Duwaybiq  to the southwest.

Demographics
In the 2004 census, Shuwayrin had a population of 695. In late 19th century, traveler Martin Hartmann noted Shuwayrin as a Turkish village of 20 houses, then located in the Ottoman nahiyah of Azaz-i Turkman.

References

Populated places in Azaz District
Turkmen communities in Syria